Haushixia (Mandarin: 花石峡镇) is a town in Madoi County, Golog Tibetan Autonomous Prefecture, Qinghai, China. In 2010, Haushixia had a total population of 4,190 people: 2,123 males and 2,067 females: 1,165 under 14 years old, 2,849 aged between 15 and 64 and 176 over 65 years old.

References 

Township-level divisions of Qinghai
Golog Tibetan Autonomous Prefecture